Spirothelphusa is a genus of crabs in the family Pseudothelphusidae, containing the following species:
 Spirothelphusa chiapensis Rodríguez & Smalley, 1969
 Spirothelphusa verticalis (Rathbun, 1893)

References

Pseudothelphusidae